The Code4Lib Journal is a quarterly journal that publishes articles about libraries and technology. It was founded by the Code4Lib community in 2007. Code4Lib publishes under a US CC-BY licence. Code4Lib Journal is also open peer reviewed.

History 
The "hacker librarian" culture of the early 2000s led to an active community of library technologists: Code4Lib. In December 2007, the first issue of Code4Lib journal was published as an experiment to supplement this Code4Lib community.  The journal's audience is "generally those working as technologists in libraries. Articles are often of a practical nature, describing coding behind projects and often providing samples of code or project architecture."

The Code4lib Journal was mostly published quarterly until 2020. Due to the pandemic and other social factors it has been published three times each in 2020, and 2021, respectively.

The journal is published by Code4Lib.

Submission guidelines recommend using the Council of Science Editors (CSE) Style Guide for referencing.

Abstracting and indexing 
The journal is abstracted and indexed in Directory of Open Access Journals, and Library, Information Science & Technology Abstracts.

Coordinating Editors 
The coordinating editor role is shared between the editorial committee per issue rather than being a standing appointment.

 Terry Reese, Issue 53 
 Mark Swenson, Issue 52
 Edward M. Corrado, Issue 51
 Eric Hanson, Issue 50 
 Jonathan Rochkind, Issue 1

References

External links 
 Code4Lib Journal

Library science journals
Open access journals